George Parker (born 25 April 1996, in Leicester), is a professional squash player who represents England. He reached a career-high world ranking of World No. 25 in October 2022.

Squash career
George made his professional debut in 2012 whilst finishing his junior career that culminated in him winning the Under-19 European Championships in 2015, defeating Edmon Lopez Moller of Spain in the final.

George made an immediate impact on the professional tour winning the Barcelona Open just six months later, this triumph saw him break into the world's top 100 rankings for the first time. However in 2016 his fiery temperament resulted in a warning for breaking a racquet during a match in frustration and the Professional Squash Association (PSA) later handed George a six-month suspension.

After this imposed break, he soon made it back into the top 100 at the end of the 2016-17 season. He has won seven professional titles and during 2018 continued his progression and is now in the top 50. In October 2022 he reached a career high of world number 25.

References

External links 

English male squash players
Living people
1996 births